Robbery Alla Turca (Turkish title: Hırsız Var!, meaning "There's a Thief!")  is a 2005 Turkish comedy film directed by Oğuzhan Tercan.

Plot
The authorities raid a millionaire's home and expropriate his properties, which include some paintings from the family heirloom. The paintings are taken to an exhibition centre where Seçkin, the designer brother of the millionaire's wife Binnur is set to have his fashion show. Two thieves from Germany, Pamir and Lokman arrive in Turkey with plans to steal the paintings. Meanwhile, a gangster Ekrem is released from prison and he seeks to get even with his ex-girlfriend Ceren, who is one of Seçkin's models.

Cast
Haluk Bilginer as Seçkin Doruk
Mehmet Ali Erbil as Ekrem
Gamze Özçelik as Ceren
Gülse Birsel as Binnur
Birol Ünel as Pamir
Fatih Akın as Lokman
Dost Elver as Gökhan
Suna Pekuysal as Nezaket
Ahmet Mümtaz Taylan as Orkun
Haldun Boysan as Fethi
Esra Eron as Begüm
Hakan Salınmış as Turgut

References

External links

2005 films
Turkish comedy films
2000s Turkish-language films
2005 comedy films
Films set in Turkey